General elections were held in Portugal on 28 April 1918, following a coup by Sidónio Pais in December 1917. The elections were boycotted by the Democratic Party, the Evolutionist Party and the Republican Union, who had won over 90% of the seats in the 1915 elections.

Although they included the first direct vote election for the position of President, Pais was the only candidate and the vote was uncontested. In the parliamentary elections the result was a victory for the National Republican Party, which won 108 of the 155 seats in the House of Representatives and 32 of the 73 seats in the indirectly elected Senate.

Results

President

Parliament

Aftermath
Pais was assassinated in Lisbon on 14 December. On 16 December João do Canto e Castro was elected by parliament for a "transitional term".

References

External links
Eleições de 1918

Legislative elections in Portugal
Portugal
1918 elections in Portugal
April 1918 events